Viola B. Muse (born 1890) was an ethnographer and hairdresser who worked for the Federal Writers Project in 1936 and 1937. She interviewed African Americans on their experiences including in and around Tampa, Florida. Her subjects included prominent community leaders, former slaves, and described African American publications of the time, and did other ethnographic work in the Lavilla community of Jacksonville and African American sections of Tampa.

She was born in Alabama. She married John P. Muse (died 1964). She worked as a hairdresser in the Lavilla community of Jacksonville.

The Federal Writers Project in Florida was headed by Carita Doggett Corse. Her unit covering "Negros" in the Lavilla section of Jacksonville was headed by Zora Neal Hurston.

Muse interviewed former slaves, including two from Tallahassee (Willie Williams and Charles Coates), and field workers including one in Palatka, Florida. She also wrote about churches and education.

She interviewed a female daughter of a Cherokee / African American mother and slave owner father.

Bibliography
Ethnography, Tampa Florida, 16 pages

References

American ethnographers
American hairdressers
1890 births
Year of death missing